Down in the Delta is a 1998 American-Canadian drama film, directed by Maya Angelou in her sole film directorial effort and starring Alfre Woodard, Al Freeman, Jr., Esther Rolle (in her final film appearance before her death), Loretta Devine, and Wesley Snipes.

Plot
Rosa Lynn Sinclair, an elderly woman, lives in a Chicago housing project with her daughter Loretta and her two grandchildren, four-year-old Tracy (who is autistic) and thirteen–year-old Thomas. Disappointed in Loretta's life choices and afraid of the troubled circumstances surrounding her grandson Thomas, Rosa Lynn decides to send her daughter and grandchildren to visit with her brother-in-law in Mississippi for the summer.

Loretta, a drug addict, declines to go, especially since her uncle Earl lives in the dry and rural part of Mississippi and already juggles his business and a wife, Annie, who has Alzheimer's disease and is being cared for by a housekeeper. Before they depart, Rosa Lynn pawns a silver candelabra, a family heirloom they refer to as "Nathan", the name of their slave ancestor. Exiting the pawn shop, Loretta throws the pawn ticket in a wastebasket, but then retrieves it, intending to redeem Nathan later for drugs.

Earl, a wise man of few words, welcomes the trio to rural Mississippi. Earl puts Loretta to work in his chicken joint, Just Chicken, where she initially has trouble handling the work and the demands of a schedule. Eventually, however, the family begin to find strength in their roots, and start to rebuild their lives, with Thomas teaching Loretta enough arithmetic to be able to waitress and thus make more in tips, Loretta becoming friendly with a nice local customer named Carl (Nigel Shawn Williams), and Tracy actually saying her first words.

While a few calamities ensue, one involving Earl teaching Thomas about guns and the other when Annie wanders outside unsupervised, by the end of the summer the initially sullen Loretta decides to stay on and make her life in the delta. In the final scene, Earl reveals that Loretta's great-great-grandfather, a slave named Nathan, was traded for the silver candelabra. Nathan's son Jesse stole back the candelabra, which has since been passed through the generations, along with Nathan's story.

Cast

 Alfre Woodard as Loretta Sinclair
 Al Freeman Jr. as Earl Sinclair
 Esther Rolle as Annie Sinclair
 Mary Alice as Rosa Lynn Sinclair
 Loretta Devine as Zenia
 Wesley Snipes as Will Sinclair
 Anne-Marie Johnson as Monica Sinclair
 Mpho Koaho as Thomas Sinclair
 Justin Lord as Dr. Rainey
 Kulani Hassen as Tracy Sinclair
 Sandra Caldwell as Volunteer
 Colleen Williams as Tourist Woman
 Richard Blackburn as Tourist Man
 Philip Akin as Manager
 Mary Fallick as Drug Addict
 Sandi Ross as Pawnbroker
 Barbara Barnes-Hopkins as Prim Woman
 Richard Yearwood as Marco
 Troy Seivwright-Adams as Collin
 Kevin Duhaney	as Justin

Music
The original soundtrack was released by Virgin Records.
 "Believe in Love" - Sunday (featuring Whitney Houston)
 "God's Stepchild" - Janet Jackson
 "Heaven Must Be Like This" - D'Angelo
 "If Ever" - Stevie Wonder
 "Where Would I Be" - The Leverts (Eddie, Gerald, and Sean)
 "I'm Only Human" - Luther Vandross (featuring Cassandra Wilson and Bob James)
 "Just A Little Luv" - Shawn Stockman
 "We Belong Together" - Tony Thompson And Antoinette
 "Don't Talk 2 Strangers" - Chaka Khan
 "Let It Go" - Jazzyfatnastees featuring The Roots
 "My Soul Don't Dream" - Meshell N'degeocello & Keb' Mo'
 "Uh Uh Ooh Ooh Look Out Here It Comes" - Ashford & Simpson
 "Don't Let Nuthin' Keep You Down" - Sounds of Blackness
 "Family (Score)" - Stanley Clarke
 "The Rain" - Tracie Spencer
 "Patchwork Quilt" - Sweet Honey in the Rock

Reception

Box office
The film was successful on limited release, grossing $2,497,557	on its first week of release.

Critical response
On review aggregate site Rotten Tomatoes, Down in the Delta has an approval rating of 77% based on 73 critics' reviews. The consensus states: "Although director Maya Angelou is done few favors by a screenplay drawn in broad strokes, Down in the Delta offers some fine performances and a heartfelt message." 

Alfre Woodard's work drew praise from San Francisco Chronicle reviewer Peter Stack, who lauded her for "a beautifully layered performance...Woodard is magical as a single mother haunted by drugs, alcohol and an inadequate education. She almost single-handedly shores up this somewhat simplistic movie...[h]er instincts for drama and humor provide a welcome dose of human reality, saving a script that veers toward the sentimental."

In Variety, Joe Leydon wrote, "Throughout Down in the Delta, Angelou and Goble emphasize simple truths and intelligent optimism", and that the film "places great stock in the strength of family ties and the soul-enhancing value of returning to roots" without crossing into melodrama.

Awards and nominations 

 Acapulco Black Film Festival
 Best Film (nominated)
 Best Director - Maya Angelou (nominated)
 Best Actress - Alfre Woodard (nominated)
 Best Soundtrack (nominated)
 Chicago International Film Festival
 Audience Choice for Best Feature - Maya Angelou (winner)
 Independent Spirit Awards
 Best Female Lead - Alfre Woodard (nominated)
 NAACP Image Awards
 Outstanding Lead Actress in a Motion Picture - Alfre Woodard (nominated)
 Outstanding Motion Picture (nominated)
 Prism Awards
 Theatrical Feature Film (winner)
 Young Artist Awards
 Best Performance in a Feature Film - Young Actress Age Ten or Under - Kulani Hassen (nominated)

References

External links
 
 
 

1998 films
1998 drama films
1998 independent films
African-American drama films
Canadian drama films
English-language Canadian films
Films produced by Wesley Snipes
Films scored by Stanley Clarke
Films set in Chicago
Films set in Mississippi
Films shot in Toronto
Films directed by Maya Angelou
1998 directorial debut films
1990s English-language films
1990s American films
1990s Canadian films
Films about disability